This is a list of Indian documentary films arranged in alphabetical order.

Documentary
Indian